Uzunkaş (former Apsun) is a village in Yenişehir district, which is an intracity district within Greater Mersin, Turkey. The village is situated in Toros Mountains. The population of the village was 354  as of 2012. The main agricultural products are citrus and other fruits.

References